Esse Artista Sou Eu (English: That Artist It's Me) is a Brazilian reality television singing competition based on the Spanish series Your Face Sounds Familiar, hosted by Marcio Ballas.

The show involved seven celebrities (actors, comedians, singers and musicians) portraying various iconic singers each week to win the R$50.000 prize.

The series premiered on Monday, August 25, 2014 at 11:30 p.m. (BRT / AMT) on SBT. On December 22, Vanessa Jackson won the competition over Li Martins, Christian Chávez and Marcelo Augusto, who took second, third and fourth respectively.

On April 23, 2017, Rede Globo rebooted the series as Show dos Famosos, airing as a 1-hour segment during Domingão do Faustão.

Contestants

Elimination chart

Key
  Eliminated
  Fourth place
  Third place
  Runner-up
  Winner

Live show details

Week 1
Aired: August 25, 2014

Week 2
Aired: September 2, 2014

Week 3
Aired: September 9, 2014

Week 4
Aired: September 16, 2014

Week 5
Aired: September 23, 2014

Week 6
Aired: September 30, 2014

Week 7
Aired: October 6, 2014

Week 8
Aired: October 13, 2014

Week 9
Aired: October 20, 2014

Week 10
Aired: October 27, 2014

Week 11
Aired: November 3, 2014

Week 12
Aired: November 10, 2014

Week 13
Aired: November 17, 2014
 Guest judge: Roberta Miranda

Week 14
Aired: November 24, 2014

Week 15
Aired: December 1, 2014
Running order

Week 16
Aired: December 8, 2014

Week 17
Aired: December 15, 2014
  Eliminated

Week 18
Aired: December 22, 2014

Ratings

Brazilian ratings
All ratings are in points and are provided by IBOPE.

 In 2014, each point represents 65.000 households in São Paulo.

References

External links
 Esse Artista Sou Eu on SBT.com

2014 Brazilian television series debuts
2014 in Brazilian television
Brazilian reality television series